Junior Michael is a former association footballer from Samoa, who played as a forward during his career. Michael played for 5 clubs as well as the Samoa national football team.

Club career

Titavi FC

Michael began his career with the club from Samoa, spending five years at Titavi FC. During the player's time with the club, Titavi won the Samoa National League in 2000 and competed in the 2000-01 Oceania Club Championship. In the club championship, Titavi finished third in their group of 5 teams, narrowly missing out on the semi-finals of the competition.

Kiwi FC

Junior joined another Samoa-based club, Kiwi FC, in 2002. He only spent a year at the club before moving on again, to play for a foreign team for the first time in his career.

PanSa East FC

Michael signed for American Samoan side PanSa East FC in 2003. PanSa are historically American Samoa's most successful club, but they failed to win any silverware in the year Michael spent with them. At PanSa, Junior played alongside fellow Samoan Iosefa Maposua, a defender.

AST Central United

Samoan team AST Central United managed to lure Michael back to his country of birth in 2004. He spent two years at the club. During Michael's first season with Central United, they finished 5th in the Samoa National League. Junior scored twice in nine games in 2004, against Hosanna and Moa Moa. Both games finished 3-0 to Central United.  Central United also reached the semi-finals of the Samoan National Cup in 2005, Michael's penultimate season with the club.

Gruz Azull

Gruz were Michael's final club before his retirement in 2007. He only spent a year at the club before hanging up his boots. However, he struck lucky in his decision to join the club, as Gruz Azull won the Samoa National League in 2007 for the only time in their history.

International career

All of Michael's 13 appearances for Samoa came in qualification matches for a FIFA World Cup. He made his debut for the national team against Cook Islands in November 1996, in a 2-0 win for Samoa. The striker made his final appearance for the national team in the 2-1 win over Tonga in  August 2007.

One of Michael's goals for his country came in the 8-0 win over American Samoa at Coffs Harbour, Australia in 2001. He also scored in a 4-1 loss to Papua New Guinea on 19 May 2004 in the 2004 Oceanian Nations Cup.

References

Living people
1971 births
Samoan footballers
Samoa international footballers
PanSa East FC players
Association football forwards